The Alabama Department of Youth Services School District is the school district of the Alabama Department of Youth Services, located in Mount Meigs, Alabama. Dr. John Stewart is the superintendent.

References

External links

 Official site

School districts in Alabama
Education in Montgomery County, Alabama